Pastor Pareda Morales (1889 – death unknown) was a Cuban pitcher in the Negro leagues and Cuban League between 1908 and 1923.

A native of Havana, Cuba, Pareda made his Negro leagues debut in 1909 with the Cuban Stars (West), and played with the club for several seasons. He also played for the All Cubans in 1911, and for several teams in the Cuban League, including Habana, Club Fé, and Azul.

References

External links
  and Seamheads

1889 births
Date of birth missing
Year of death missing
Place of death missing
All Cubans players
Azul (baseball) players
Club Fé players
Cuban Stars (West) players
Habana players
Baseball pitchers